Kaylene Whiskey is a contemporary Aboriginal Australian artist.  She won the 2018 Sir John Sulman Prize at the Art Gallery of New South Wales and was a finalist for the 2020 Archibald Prize. Her work is exhibited in many important Australian galleries. 

Whiskey is a Pitjantjatjara woman from Indulkana, a remote Aboriginal community in South Australia, and is the granddaughter of Whiskey Tjukangku. Like her grandfather, she paints with Iwantja Arts.

Life and painting 
Whiskey was born and raised in the small community of Indulkana in the APY Lands to a family very involved in the arts, and she grew up around the art centre. As she grew older, she said that painting there was "a good way to keep busy and spend time with my family".

She has developed a unique style which includes pop stars in bright colours; her favourite musicians Dolly Parton, Tina Turner, Michael Jackson and Cher (whom she often listens to as she paints) are often featured in her work. Whiskey says:

Whiskey refers to these idols as her kungkas, which means "woman", most often "young woman", in the Yankunytjatjara language. She has said:

Recognition and awards 

 In 2018 Whiskey won the Sir John Sulman Prize for her acrylic painting "Kaylene TV", featuring two of her favourite kungkas, Dolly Parton and Cher.
 In 2019 Whiskey won the Telstra General Painting Award at the Telstra National Aboriginal and Torres Strait Islander Art Awards for her water-based enamel painting "Seven Sistas", showing her irreverent interpretation of the Seven Sisters Dreaming (Kungkarangkalpa Tjukurpa), where she casts her own heroic women into the roles. These women include Wonder Woman and Dorothy from The Wizard of Oz.
 Whiskey was a finalist of the Archibald Prize in 2020 for her self-portrait (in which she is accompanied by Dolly Parton); this work is entitled: "Dolly visits Indulkana".

Exhibitions 
2018: A Lightness of Spirit is the Measure of Happiness, at the Australian Centre for Contemporary Art in Melbourne; featuring 10 specially commissioned works by Aboriginal artists of south-east Australia, including Whiskey,  Robert Fielding, Vincent Namatjira, Yhonnie Scarce, Tiger Yaltangki and others.
 2019: The National 2019: New Australian Art at the Museum of Contemporary Art.
2022: Iwantja Rock n Roll at the Fort Gansevoort gallery in New York, along with the work of Vincent Namatjira and Tiger Yaltangki. Included in the exhibition is her work Kungkas in Hollywood (2021), in which the artist is portrayed in a fantastical scene with Beyoncé and Dolly Parton.

See also 
 Art of Australia

References 

Living people
Year of birth missing (living people)
Artists from the Northern Territory
Australian Aboriginal artists
21st-century Australian women artists
21st-century Australian artists
Archibald Prize finalists